The naming of moons has been the responsibility of the International Astronomical Union's committee for Planetary System Nomenclature since 1973. That committee is known today as the Working Group for Planetary System Nomenclature (WGPSN).

Prior to its formation, the names of satellites have had varying histories. The choice of names is often determined by a satellite's discoverer; however, historically some satellites were not given names for many years after their discovery; for instance, Titan was discovered by Huygens in 1655, but was not named until 1847, almost two centuries later.

Before the IAU assumed responsibility for astronomical nomenclature, only twenty-five satellites had been given names that were in wide use and are still used: 1 of Earth, 2 of Mars, 5 of Jupiter, 10 of Saturn, 5 of Uranus, and 2 of Neptune. The number will continue to rise as current satellite discoveries are documented and new satellites are discovered.

At the IAU General Assembly in July 2004, the WGPSN suggested it may become advisable to not name small satellites, as CCD technology makes it possible to discover satellites as small as 1 km in diameter. Until 2014, names were applied to all planetary moons discovered, regardless of size. From 2015, some small moons have not received names.

Naming of moons by Solar System object

Earth 

Every human language has its own word for the Earth's Moon, and these words are the ones normally used in astronomical contexts. However, a number of fanciful or mythological names for the Moon have been used in the context of astronomy (an even larger number of lunar epithets have been used in non-astronomical contexts). In the 17th century, the Moon was sometimes referred to as Proserpina. More recently, especially in science-fictional contexts, the Moon has been called by the Latin name Luna, presumably on the analogy of the Latin names of the planets, or by association with the adjectival form lunar. In technical terminology, the word-stems seleno- (from Greek selēnē "moon") and cynthi- (from Cynthia, an epithet of the goddess Artemis) are sometimes used to refer to the Moon, as in selenography, selenology, and pericynthion.

Mars 

The moons of Mars (Phobos and Deimos) were named by Asaph Hall in 1878, soon after he discovered them. They are named after the sons of the god Ares (the Greek equivalent of the Roman god Mars).

Jupiter 

The Galilean moons of Jupiter (Io, Europa, Ganymede and Callisto) were named by Simon Marius soon after their discovery in 1610. However, by the late 19th century these names had fallen out of favor, and for a long time it was most common to refer to them in the astronomical literature simply as "Jupiter I", "Jupiter II", etc., or as "the first satellite of Jupiter", "Jupiter's second satellite", etc.

By the first decade of the 20th century, the names Io, Europa, Ganymede, and Callisto had once again recovered popularity, but the later-discovered moons, numbered, usually in Roman numerals V (5) through XII (12), remained unnamed. By a popular though unofficial convention, Jupiter V, discovered in 1892, was given the name Amalthea, first used by the French astronomer Camille Flammarion.

The other irregular satellites (discovered 1904 to 1951) were, in the overwhelming majority of astronomical literature, simply left nameless. No names were proposed until Brian G. Marsden suggested a nomenclature for these satellites in 1955.  Although the 1955 names met with immediate acceptance in some quarters (e.g. in science fiction and popular science articles), they were still rarely if ever met in astronomical literature until the 1970s.

Two other proposals for naming the satellites were made between 1955 and 1975, both by Soviet astronomers, E. I. Nesterovich (in 1962) and Yu. A. Karpenko (in 1973). These met no particularly enthusiastic reception.

In 1975, following Charles Kowal's discovery of the satellite Jupiter XIII in 1974, the IAU Task Group for Outer Solar System Nomenclature granted names to satellites V-XIII, and provided for a formal naming process for future satellites to be discovered. Under the new process, Jupiter V continued as Amalthea, Jupiter XIII was named Leda in accordance with a suggestion of Kowal's, and all previous proposals for the seven satellites VI-XII were abandoned in favor of new names, in accordance with a scheme suggested by the German philologist Jürgen Blunck where prograde moons received names ending in 'a' and retrograde moons received names ending in 'e'.

The new names met considerable protest from some quarters. Kowal, despite suggesting a name for Jupiter XIII, was of the opinion that Jupiter's irregular satellites should not be named at all.  Carl Sagan noted that the names chosen were extraordinarily obscure (a fact that Tobias Owen, chair of the Task Group, admitted was intentional in a response to Sagan) and suggested his own names in 1976; these preserved some of the names from the 1955 proposal. Karpenko had noted the same in his 1981 book "The Names of the Starry Sky", along with stating that the names chosen for retrograde moons, and therefore the "e" ending, were not always the ones for which it was the more common one.

The proposals are summarized in the table below (data from Icarus unless specified otherwise):

Current practice is that newly discovered moons of Jupiter must be named after lovers or descendants of the mythological Jupiter (Zeus). Blunck's scheme for the outer moons was retained, with the addition that names ending in 'o' could also be used for prograde moons. At the IAU General Assembly in July 2004, the WGPSN allowed Jovian satellites to be named for Zeus' descendants in addition to his lovers and favorites which were the previous source of names, due to the large number of new Jovian satellites that had then recently been discovered. All of Jupiter's satellites from XXXIV (Euporie) on were named for descendants of Zeus, until Jupiter LIII (Dia), named after another one of his lovers.

Saturn 

In 1847, the seven then known moons of Saturn were named by John Herschel. Herschel named Saturn's two innermost moons (Mimas and Enceladus) after the mythological Greek Giants, and the outer five after the Titans (Titan, Iapetus) and Titanesses (Tethys, Dione, Rhea) of the same mythology. Until then, Titan was known as the "Huygenian (or Huyghenian) satellite of Saturn" and the other moons had Roman numeral designations in order of their distance from Saturn. Subsequent discoverers of Saturnian moons followed Herschel's scheme: Hyperion was discovered soon after in 1848, and the ninth moon, Phoebe, was named by its discoverer in 1899 soon after its discovery; they were named for a Titan and a Titaness respectively. The name of Janus was suggested by its discoverer, Audouin Dollfus.

Current IAU practice for newly discovered inner moons is to continue with Herschel's system, naming them after Titans or their descendants. However, the increasing number of moons that were being discovered in the 21st century caused the IAU to draw up a new scheme for the outer moons. At the IAU General Assembly in July 2004, the WGPSN allowed satellites of Saturn to have names of giants and monsters in mythologies other than the Greco-Roman. Since the outer moons fall naturally into three groups, one group is named after Norse giants, one after Gallic giants, and one after Inuit giants. The only moon that fails to fit this scheme is the Greek-named Phoebe, which is in the Norse group.

Uranus 

The Roman numbering scheme of Uranus' moons was in a state of flux for a considerable time. Sir William Herschel thought he had discovered up to six moons and maybe even a ring. For nearly fifty years, Herschel's instrument was the only one the moons had been seen with. In the 1840s, better instruments and a more favourable position of Uranus in the sky led to sporadic indications of satellites additional to Titania and Oberon. Publications hesitated between William Herschel's designations (where Titania and Oberon are Uranus II and IV) and William Lassell's (where they are sometimes I and II). With the confirmation of Ariel and Umbriel, Lassell numbered the moons I through IV from Uranus outward, and this finally stuck.

The first two Uranian moons, discovered in 1787, did not receive names until 1852, a year after two more moons had been discovered. The responsibility for naming was taken by John Herschel, son of the discoverer of Uranus. Herschel, instead of assigning names from Greek mythology, named the moons after magical spirits in English literature: the fairies Oberon and Titania from William Shakespeare's A Midsummer Night's Dream, and the sylphs Ariel and Umbriel from Alexander Pope's The Rape of the Lock (Ariel is also a sprite in Shakespeare's The Tempest). The reasoning was presumably that Uranus, as god of the sky and air, would be attended by spirits of the air.

Subsequent names, rather than continuing the "airy spirits" theme (only Puck and Mab continuing the trend), have focused on Herschel's source material. In 1949, the fifth moon, Miranda, was named by its discoverer, Gerard Kuiper, after a thoroughly mortal character in Shakespeare's The Tempest. Current IAU practice is to name moons after characters from Shakespeare's plays and The Rape of the Lock (although at present only Ariel, Umbriel, and Belinda have names drawn from the latter poem, all the rest being from Shakespeare). All the retrograde irregular moons are named after characters from one play, The Tempest; the only prograde irregular moon, Margaret, is named from Much Ado About Nothing.

Neptune 

The one known moon (at the time) of Neptune was not named for many decades. Although the name Triton was suggested in 1880 by Camille Flammarion, it did not come into general use until the mid 20th-century, and for many years was considered "unofficial". In the astronomical literature it was simply referred to as "the satellite of Neptune". Later, the second known moon, Nereid, was named by its discoverer in 1949, Gerard P. Kuiper, soon after its discovery.

Current IAU practice for newly discovered Neptunian moons is to accord with these first two choices by naming them after Greek sea deities.

For the "normal" irregular satellites, the general convention is to use names ending in "a" for prograde satellites, names ending in "e" for retrograde satellites, and names ending in "o" for exceptionally inclined satellites, exactly like the convention for the moons of Jupiter.

Pluto 

The name of Pluto's moon Charon was suggested by James W. Christy, its discoverer, soon after its discovery.

The other four moons are named Hydra, Nix, Kerberos, and Styx.

Charon, Hydra, Nix, and Kerberos are all characters in Greek mythology, with ties to Hades (the Greek equivalent of Pluto).  Charon ferries the dead across the River Acheron, Hydra guards the waters of the underworld, and Nix (a respelling of Nyx), mother of Charon, is the goddess of darkness and the night. Kerberos is a giant three-headed dog who guards the entrance to the underworld. The fifth moon is named for the river Styx that forms the boundary between the worlds of the living and the dead.

Eris 

The name of Eris's moon Dysnomia was suggested by its discoverer Michael E. Brown, who also suggested the name of the dwarf planet. The name has two meanings: in mythology Dysnomia (lawlessness) is the daughter of Eris (chaos). However, the name is also an intentional reference to the actor Lucy Lawless who plays the character Xena. The background for this is that during the long period when Eris had no formal name, the name 'Xena' – originally Brown's nickname for his discovery – spread and became popular. When the name 'Eris' was chosen, Brown suggested Dysnomia (which until then had been referred to as Gabrielle) as a reference to this. Hence, Dysnomia is the only moon which could be said to be named after an actor. The names Eris and Dysnomia were accepted by the IAU on 14 September 2006.

Haumea 

The name of Haumea and its moons were suggested by David L. Rabinowitz of Caltech and refer to the mother goddess and her daughters in Hawaiian mythology.

Gonggong 

When the discoverers of Gonggong proposed choices for a public vote on its name, they chose figures that had associates that could provide a name for the satellite. Xiangliu's name was chosen by its discovery team led by Csaba Kiss.

Quaoar 

Quaoar was named after the creator god of the Tongva tribe. Brown, who had co-discovered both Quaoar and its moon, left the name of the moon up to the Tongva. The Tongva chose the sky god Weywot, son of Quaoar.

Orcus 

On 23 March 2009, Brown asked readers of his weekly column to suggest possible names for the satellite of Orcus which he had codiscovered, with the best one to be submitted to the International Astronomical Union (IAU) on 5 April. The name Vanth, the winged Etruscan psychopomp who guides the souls of the dead to the underworld, was chosen from among a large pool of submissions. Vanth was the only suggestion that was purely Etruscan in origin. It was the most popular submission, first suggested by Sonya Taaffe.

Brown quoted Taaffe as saying that if Vanth "accompanies dead souls from the moment of death to the underworld itself, then of course her face is turned always toward Orcus", a reference to the likely synchronous orbit of Vanth about Orcus.

Asteroids and other trans-Neptunian objects 

Unlike the planets and dwarf planets, relatively few moons orbiting asteroids have been named. Among them are the following:

Roman numeral designations 
The Roman numbering system for satellites arose with the very first discovery of natural satellites other than Earth's Moon: Galileo referred to the Galilean moons as I through IV (counting from Jupiter outward), refusing to adopt the names proposed by his rival Simon Marius. Similar numbering schemes naturally arose with the discovery of multiple moons around Saturn, Uranus, and Mars. The numbers initially designated the moons in orbital sequence, and were re-numbered after each new discovery; for instance, before the discovery of Mimas and Enceladus in 1789, Tethys was Saturn I, Dione Saturn II, etc., but after the new moons were discovered, Mimas became Saturn I, Enceladus Saturn II, Tethys Saturn III and Dione Saturn IV.

In the middle of the 19th century, however, the numeration became fixed, and later discoveries failed to conform with the orbital sequence scheme.  Amalthea, discovered in 1892, was labelled "Jupiter V" although it orbits more closely to Jupiter than does Io (Jupiter I). The unstated convention then became, at the close of the 19th century, that the numbers more or less reflected the order of discovery, except for prior historical exceptions (see Timeline of discovery of Solar System planets and their natural satellites); though if a large number of satellites were discovered in a short span of time, the group could be numbered in orbital sequence, or according to other principles than strictly by order of discovery. The convention has been extended to natural satellites of minor planets, such as (87) Sylvia I Romulus. The outer irregular satellites of Jupiter (VI through XII) were left officially unnamed throughout this period, although as stated above some unofficial names were used in some contexts.

From 1975 to 2009, the International Astronomical Union was assigning names to all planetary satellites, and Roman numerals were usually not assigned to satellites until they are named. (An exception is Saturn's moon Helene, which received the Roman numeral XII in 1982, but was not named until 1988.) During this period, the use of Roman numeral designations diminished, and some are very rarely used; Phobos and Deimos are rarely referred to as Mars I and Mars II, and the Moon is never referred to as "Earth I". However, since 2015 some moons have again been numbered without being named, starting from Jupiter LI.

The thirteen named satellites of Saturn from Aegir to Surtur were named in alphabetical order corresponding to their Roman numerals.

Provisional designations 
When satellites are first discovered, they are given provisional designations such as "S/2010 J 2" (the 2nd new satellite of Jupiter discovered in 2010) or "S/2003 S 1" (the 1st new satellite of Saturn discovered in 2003). The initial "S/" stands for "satellite", and distinguishes from such prefixes as "D/", "C/", and "P/", used for comets. The designation "R/" is used for planetary rings. These designations are sometimes written like "S/2003 S1", dropping the second space. The letter following the category and year identifies the planet (Jupiter, Saturn, Uranus, Neptune; although no occurrence of the other planets is expected, Mars and Mercury are disambiguated through the use of Hermes for the latter). Pluto was designated by P prior to its recategorization as a dwarf planet. When the object is found around a minor planet, the identifier used is the latter's number in parentheses. Thus, Dactyl, the moon of 243 Ida, was at first designated "S/1993 (243) 1". Once confirmed and named, it became (243) Ida I Dactyl. Similarly, the fourth satellite of Pluto, Kerberos, discovered after Pluto was categorized as a dwarf planet and assigned a minor planet number, was designated S/2011 (134340) 1 rather than S/2011 P 1, though the New Horizons team, who maintained that dwarf planets were planets, used the latter.
 H = Mercury (Hermes)
 V = Venus
 E = Earth
 M = Mars
 J = Jupiter
 S = Saturn
 U = Uranus
 N = Neptune

Note: The assignation of "H" for Mercury is specified by the USGS Gazetteer of Planetary Nomenclature; since they usually follow IAU guidelines closely, this is very likely the IAU convention, but confirmation is needed: there have been no moons found to be orbiting Mercury as of yet.

After a few months or years, when a newly discovered satellite's existence has been confirmed and its orbit computed, a permanent name is chosen, which replaces the "S/" provisional designation. However, in the past, some satellites remained unnamed for surprisingly long periods after their discovery.

Timeline 
The timeline only includes moons of the planets and the more likely dwarf planets.

Pre-IAU names 
The following names were adopted by informal processes preceding the assumption by the IAU of control over the assignment of satellite nomenclature in 1973.

IAU names 
The following names were selected through a formal process controlled by the IAU. Only in a few cases is the person who chose the name identified.

20th century

21st century 
For completeness, moons that were left unnamed upon their official numbering have also been included.

Other references 
 Astronomical Headlines
 Astronomical headlines (old)
 Gazetteer of Planetary Nomenclature

See also 

 Timeline of discovery of Solar System planets and their moons
 Astronomical naming conventions
 Provisional designation in astronomy
 Planetary nomenclature
 Name conflicts of solar system objects

Notes 

Moons

Moons